Nesria Traki (born 8 March 1972) is a Tunisian judoka. She competed in the women's middleweight event at the 2000 Summer Olympics.

References

1972 births
Living people
Tunisian female judoka
Olympic judoka of Tunisia
Judoka at the 2000 Summer Olympics
Place of birth missing (living people)
Mediterranean Games bronze medalists for Tunisia
Mediterranean Games medalists in judo
Competitors at the 1997 Mediterranean Games
21st-century Tunisian women
20th-century Tunisian women
African Games medalists in judo
African Games bronze medalists for Tunisia